Henry Lynde "Harry" Palmer (October 18, 1819May 6, 1909) was an American lawyer and Democratic politician. He was the 6th Speaker of the Wisconsin State Assembly, where he was a member for four terms.  He also served in the Wisconsin State Senate for two sessions, representing Milwaukee County, and was the Democratic nominee for Governor of Wisconsin in the 1863 election.

Biography
Palmer was born on October 18, 1819 in Mount Pleasant, Pennsylvania, to Thaddeus and Martha Palmer. He later moved to New York City and became a lawyer. In 1849, he moved to Wisconsin, settling in Milwaukee, and began practicing law. Palmer became President of Wisconsin Mutual Life Insurance Company in 1874. During his tenure, the company moved to Milwaukee from Janesville, Wisconsin, and was renamed the Northwestern Mutual Life Insurance Company. Palmer died on May 6, 1909.

Freemasonry 

Palmer was an active member of Wisconsin Lodge #13.  He led his lodge as Worshipful Master in 1851, 1852, 1857, 1858, 1865 and 1867.  After his passing, Henry L. Palmer #301 Lodge, founded in 1911, was named in his honor.

Henry L. Palmer Lodge #301 located in Wauwatosa, Wisconsin, continues to be a vibrant lodge today.

Palmer was very active in the Scottish Rite in the Valley of Milwaukee Scottish Rite building located in downtown Milwaukee next to Northwestern Mutual Life Insurance Company.

Most significantly, he was elected as the leader of the Northern Masonic Jurisdiction, serving as Sovereign Grand Commander from 1879 to 1909.

Political career
Palmer was a member of the Assembly for four terms and a member of the Senate from 1867 to 1868, elected in a special election after the death of Senator Jackson Hadley. In 1863, he was a candidate for Governor of Wisconsin, losing to James Taylor Lewis. Palmer was later a probate court judge for Milwaukee County from 1873 to 1874. He was a Democrat.

References

External links
 
  Henry L. Palmer Lodge 301 F. & A.M.

People from Wayne County, Pennsylvania
Politicians from Milwaukee
Democratic Party Wisconsin state senators
Democratic Party members of the Wisconsin State Assembly
Wisconsin lawyers
New York (state) lawyers
1819 births
1909 deaths
Lawyers from Milwaukee
Speakers of the Wisconsin State Assembly
19th-century American politicians